Minonoa is a genus of moths of the family Dalceridae.

Species
 Minonoa elvira Dognin, 1909
 Minonoa pachitea Hopp, 1922
 Minonoa perbella Schaus, 1905

References

Dalceridae
Zygaenoidea genera